Héctor Ruíz Martínez (November 14, 1943 – May 6, 1986) was a Puerto Rican politician and teacher. He was mayor of Barceloneta from 1985 until his death in 1986.

Early years and studies

Héctor Ruíz Martínez was born on November 14, 1943, in the Tosas Sector of Barrio Magueyes in Barceloneta, Puerto Rico. He was the seventh son of Gustavo Vidal Ruíz and Filadelfia Martínez. When his mother died a month later, Héctor was taken to his grandparents who raised him. Ruíz studied his elementary school in Pajonal, but after graduating, his father enrolled him at the Rafael Balseiro Maceira Junior High School in Barceloneta. He graduated in 1962, and was the President of his class.

Ruíz enters the University of Puerto Rico, specifically the Pedagogy Department. However, before he could finish his bachelor's degree, he is called up by the United States Army to serve in the Vietnam War. After completing his years of military service, he returns to Puerto Rico and completes his degree, specializing in Spanish.

Professional career

Ruíz began working as a teacher in the Barrio Boquillas of Manatí, but he later transfers to the Urban Elementary School where he works for several years. He then works at a junior high school, where he serves as teacher of Industrial Arts and Special Education. He also served as Coordinator for the Spanish Program to the Superintendent's Office in Barceloneta. Ruíz later became part of the faculty of the Fernando Suria Cháves High School. He also directed Troop 224 of the local Cub Scouts.

Political career

Ruíz began his political career when he was appointed President of the Popular Youth in Barceloneta. He decided to run for mayor and won the primaries of his party. Ruíz went on to win at the 1984 general elections, defeating the incumbent mayor, Elí Ramos Rosario.

Death and legacy

During his short tenure as mayor, Ruíz had to deal with the bankruptcy of Barceloneta, as well as the devastation caused by Tropical Storm Isabel in 1985. His health deteriorated and Ruíz died on May 6, 1986. He was succeeded by Sol Luis Fontánes.

A housing project and a school in Barceloneta currently bear the name of Héctor Ruíz Martínez.

Personal life

Ruíz was married to Juana Ramos.

References

External links
Personas Importantes de la Política de Barceloneta

1943 births
1986 deaths
United States Army personnel of the Vietnam War
People from Barceloneta, Puerto Rico
Popular Democratic Party (Puerto Rico) politicians
Mayors of places in Puerto Rico
University of Puerto Rico alumni
United States Army soldiers
20th-century American politicians